What's My Name? was a 30-minute radio program in the United States. The program was hosted by Arlene Francis and was among the first radio shows to offer cash prizes to contestants.

Format
Contestants on What's My Name? had to identify a person from a maximum of 10 clues given by the show's two hosts. People to be identified were celebrities and historical characters.  In the show's early days, a correct guess on the first clue earned the contestant $10; the amount earned dropped by $1 with each additional clue. In 1948, the top prize was increased to $100, with $50 and $25 prizes, respectively, for identification on the second and third clues.

The program also involved listener participation to some extent, as listeners could send in questions to be used on the air. People who submitted questions received $10 for each question used.

A review of the first episode of What's My Name? offered little hope for its future, calling it "a rather drab show." The reviewer explained: "The program got off to a bad start in that the participants, for the most part, were unable to guess the identities of the characters asked for in the game until long after the listeners got the drift of the proceedings." The reviewer did, however, note that the show was "ably conducted by Bud Hulick and Arlene Francis."

Francis was a constant on What's My Name?, serving as the hostess in all eight of its iterations on radio while her male counterparts changed. Hulick was the host in three versions. Other hosts over the years were Fred Uttal, John Reed King, Ward Wilson and Carl Frank. Harry Salter and his orchestra provided the music.

One source noted that What's My Name? "helped make a broadcasting fixture out of Arlene Francis."

A 1942 review gave What's My Name? a much better evaluation than the earlier review mentioned above. Paul Ackerman wrote in The Billboard, "Name is well produced, moves quickly and manages to maintain an informal atmosphere directly traceable to Miss Francis's and Mr. King's manner with the contestants."

Background
What's My Name? was the brainchild of radio writers Joe Cross and Ed Byron. An August 1940 magazine article related that, after listening to a program called Professor Quiz, "the two of them shut themselves up in a hotel room, vowing they wouldn't come out until they'd thought up a game program that was as much fun as Professor Quiz. What's My Name? was the result."

Sponsors
General Electric sponsored What's My Name? until it left the air. It returned in 1949 with Homemakers Institute and Servel Gas Refrigerator Dealers as sponsors.

Television

A version of What's My Name? was incorporated into the Paul Winchell-Jerry Mahoney Show on television. The program (originally titled The Speidel Show after its sponsor) ran from September 18, 1950 to May 23, 1954. In the show's early years, each episode began with a comedy skit featuring Winchell and Mahoney. That skit was followed by a quiz segment, What's My Name?, similar to the radio program. The host for the quiz was Ted Brown.

The TV version of the quiz failed to achieve the success of its radio predecessor. A review in The Billboard in August 1951 said: Speidel has tried hard all season to combine the very accomplished Paul Winchell and Jerry Mahoney team and the former What's My Name? format into a successful stanza. The attempt has failed and, if anything, the talents of the ventriloquist and his little pal have been blunted by misuse."

By 1953, the What's My Name? component  of the Paul Winchell-Jerry Mahoney Show had been removed.

Broadcast Schedule

Note: "NA"—information was not listed on the cited page.

References 

1930s American radio programs
1940s American radio programs
1950s American radio programs
American radio game shows
1930s American game shows
1940s American game shows
1950s American game shows
Mutual Broadcasting System programs
NBC radio programs
ABC radio programs